Heiða Rún Sigurðardóttir known by her stage name Heida Reed (born 22 May 1988), is an Icelandic actress and model. She is known for playing parts in One Day, Jo (2013), Silent Witness (2014) and the BBC drama Poldark. She played the part of Pooky Hook, a beautiful would-be actress spurned by Steven "Toast of London" when he became infatuated with Jon Hamm because of his alleged charisma.

Early and personal life 
Reed was born in Iceland, the middle of three children of a music teacher father and a dental hygienist mother. She grew up in Breiðholt, Reykjavík, and attended Ölduselsskóli. Aged 18, she was recruited by an Icelandic modeling agency, and moved to Mumbai to work as a model in India for two years. When she was 19/20, she settled in London, where she studied drama at Drama Centre London, graduating in 2010.

As of July 2017, Reed announced through social media that she is engaged to her boyfriend, America-based producer Sam Ritzenberg.

Acting career 
Reed's first performance was in 2009 in an Edinburgh Fringe production of Camus's Cross Purpose. A reviewer for the Edinburgh Guide considered it "expertly acted and finely paced." In April 2015, Reed co-starred in the world premiere of a new play, Scarlet, by Sam H Freeman at Southwark Playhouse exploring slut-shaming and cyberbullying and their emotional repercussions. 

The same year, Reed was cast in a major role in the British historical TV drama Poldark, which was based on the novels of the same title, playing the part of Elizabeth. She appeared in all five seasons of the series.

In 2018, she appeared on the West End in Foxfinder with Iwan Rheon.

In 2021, Reed began portraying FBI Special Agent Jamie Kellett in CBS crime drama series FBI: International.

In 2022, she played the part of Professor Jocelyn Peabody in the BBC radio production of the Dan Dare story, Reign of the Robots.

Filmography

Films

TV Series

Web series

Theatre

References

External links
 
 
 
 Interview, poldarked.com
 Profile, WhatsOnStage.com

1988 births
Heida Reed
Heida Reed
Heida Reed
Heida Reed
Living people
Heida Reed
Heida Reed
Heida Reed
Alumni of the Drama Centre London